Moon Woo-jin (Korean: 문우진; born on 19 February 2009) is a South Korean child actor. He made his acting debut in 2017, since then, he has appeared in number of television series. He is known for his roles as child actor in 2019 crime series Vagabond and 2020 family drama Once Again as Kim Ji-hoon. He has also appeared in Peninsula, a 2020 horror heist film. In 2021, he appeared in school drama School 2021 as young version of Gong Ki-joon.

Career
Moon Woo-jin is affiliated to T-One Entertainment artist management company. 

In 2020, Moon appeared in KBS family weekend drama Once Again as Kim Ji-hoon. For his emotional acting in the series, he was awarded male 'Youth Acting Award' at the 2020 KBS Drama Awards.

Moon has also been appointed as Incheon City's public relations ambassador. In September 2021, he participated in 'Save the Heart' contest serving as a public model for the “Let’s share our hearts” campaign.

Filmography

Films

Television series

Web series

Awards and nominations

References

External links
 Moon Woo-jin, official website
 
 Moon Woo-jin on Daum 

Living people
People from Incheon
2009 births
South Korean male child actors
21st-century South Korean male actors
South Korean male television actors
South Korean male film actors